Hesperophylax is a genus of northern caddisflies in the family Limnephilidae. There are about seven described species in Hesperophylax.

Species
These seven species belong to the genus Hesperophylax:
 Hesperophylax alaskensis (Banks, 1908)
 Hesperophylax consimilis (Banks, 1900)
 Hesperophylax designatus (Walker, 1852) (silver-striped sedge)
 Hesperophylax magnus Banks, 1918
 Hesperophylax mexico Parker & Wiggins, 1985
 Hesperophylax minutus Ling, 1938
 Hesperophylax occidentalis (Banks, 1908)

References

Further reading

External links

 

Trichoptera genera
Articles created by Qbugbot
Integripalpia